The 2018–19 Women's EHF Challenge Cup was the 22nd edition of the European Handball Federation's third-tier competition for women's handball clubs, running from 10 November 2018.

Overview

Team allocation
There were no matches in Round 1 and 2 and all 30 teams started in Round 3 with the first leg scheduled for 10/11 November and second leg for 17/18 November.

Round and draw dates

All draws were held at the European Handball Federation headquarters in Vienna, Austria.

Qualification stage

Round 3

There were 30 teams participating in round 3.
The draw seeding pots were composed as follows:

Teams listed first played the first leg at home. Some teams agreed to play both matches in the same venue. The first legs were playeded on 10–11 November and the second legs were played on 17–18 November 2018. Some teams agreed to play both matches in the same venue.

|}
Notes

1 Both legs were hosted by ŽRK Koka.
2 Both legs were hosted by Pogoń Baltica Szczecin.
3 Both legs were hosted by Quintus.
4 Both legs were hosted by KHF Istogu.
5 Both legs were hosted by ŽRK Bjelovar.
6 Both legs were hosted by Ankara Yenimahalle BSK.
7 Both legs were hosted by ŽRK Kumanovo.
8 Both legs were hosted by AC Alavarium.
9 Both legs were hosted by Boden Handboll IF.
10 Both legs were hosted by Sir 1 Maio/Ada CJB.
11 Both legs were hosted by Fémina Visé.

Last 16
The European Handball Federation has decided the last season’s runners-up and the 2016 winners Rocasa Gran Canaria ACE will be the only team, who are directly seeded for the Last 16 round.

Seeding pots

There are 16 teams participating in Last 16 round. The draw seeding pots were composed as follows:

The draw for the Last 16 took place at the EHF Office in Vienna on Thursday 22 November 2019.
Teams listed first played the first leg at home. The first legs were played on 2-3 February and the second legs were played on 9-10 February 2019.Some teams agreed to play both matches in the same venue.

|}
Notes

1 Both legs were hosted by Maccabi Rishon LeZion.
2 Both legs were hosted by AC Alavarium.
3 Both legs were hosted by HC Gomel.
4 Both legs were hosted by Rincón Fertilidad Málaga.
5 Both legs were hosted by HC Naisa Niš.
6 Both legs were hosted by Fémina Visé.

Matches

Boden Handboll IF won 56–55 on aggregate.

Pogoń Baltica Szczecin won 73–51 on aggregate.

HC Gomel won 62–41 on aggregate.

Rincón Fertilidad Málaga won 61–22 on aggregate.

Quintus won 50–41 on aggregate.

Rocasa Gran Canaria ACE won 57–45 on aggregate.

HC Naisa Niš won 67–50 on aggregate.

Kristianstad Handboll won 52–31 on aggregate.

Quarterfinals

The draw event was held at the EHF Office in Vienna on Tuesday 12 February 2019. The draw determined the quarter-final and also the semi-final pairings. Teams listed first will play the first leg at home. For the quarter-finals, there will be no seeding as all eight teams will be drawn from the same pot one after another. There will also be no country protection applied in the draw. The semi-final draw followed using the quarter-final pairings.

The first legs were played on 2–3 March and the second legs were played on 9–10 March 2019. Some teams agreed to play both matches in the same venue.

|}

Notes

1 Both legs were hosted by Kristianstad Handboll.
2 Both legs were hosted by Boden Handboll IF.

Matches

Pogoń Baltica Szczecin won 55–49 on aggregate.

Rocasa Gran Canaria ACE won 45–44 on aggregate.

Quintus won 63–57 on aggregate.

Kristianstad Handboll won 58–52 on aggregate.

Semifinals

The first legs were played on 6–7 April and the second legs were played on 13–14 April 2019.

|}

Matches

Pogoń Baltica Szczecin won 57–43 on aggregate.

Rocasa Gran Canaria ACE won 53–37 on aggregate.

Final

The first leg was played on 4–5 May and the second legs was played on 11–12 May 2019. The final home rights draw was held on 16 April 2019 in Vienna.

|}

Matches

Rocasa Gran Canaria ACE won 53–47 on aggregate.

Top goalscorers

See also
2018–19 Women's EHF Champions League
2018–19 Women's EHF Cup

References

External links 
 EHF Womens Challenge Cup (official website)

Women's EHF Challenge Cup
EHF Challenge Cup
EHF Challenge Cup